Sanmai is an extinct genus of tettigarctid cicada from the middle Jurassic Epoch. The name is derived from the Mandarin san (three) and mai (branch) in reference to a certain vein of the wing being three-branched. This feature is also found in Architettix, a related fossil cicada genus. Sanmai currently contains three species. It undoubtedly belong to the subfamily Cicadoprosbolinae; however, placing it in a tribe has proved difficult. It is closely related to both Turutanoviini and Architettigini, and may be a transitional between the two. It is also possible it rests outside the two taxa, the similarities being convergent. Sanmai possesses "light and irregular speckles and lon-gitudinal stripes boldly contrasting to dark membrane, " which were likely designed to camouflage it from the many insectivourus creatures of the Daohugou Lagerstatte. The Daohugou Paleolake is part of the Jiulongshan Formation.

Species
The following species are attributed to this genus:

References

Tettigarctidae
Prehistoric insect genera